The 1989–90 Loyola Marymount Lions men's basketball team represented Loyola Marymount University during the 1989–90 NCAA Division I men's basketball season. The Lions were led by fifth-year head coach Paul Westhead. They played their home games at Gersten Pavilion in Los Angeles, California as members of the West Coast Conference.

Powered by consensus Second-Team All-Americans Hank Gathers and Bo Kimble, LMU led the nation in scoring for the third consecutive year and established an NCAA record of 122.4 points per game. Kimble won the NCAA individual scoring title by averaging 35.3 points per game.

On March 4, 1990, Gathers collapsed and died during a WCC Tournament Semifinal matchup against Portland. The team is remembered for honoring Gathers with a run to the Elite Eight as the 11 seed in the West Region of the NCAA tournament. They would become the first WCC team to reach the Elite Eight in 33 years. The Lions defeated New Mexico State 111–92, defending National Champion Michigan 149–115, and Alabama 62–60 before falling 131–101 to UNLV, the eventual National Champions.

Roster

Schedule and results

|-
!colspan=12 style=| Non-conference regular season

|-
!colspan=12 style=| WCC regular season

|-
!colspan=12 style=| WCC Tournament

|-
!colspan=12 style=| NCAA Tournament

Sources

Rankings

*Final AP and Coaches rankings released prior to NCAA tournament

Awards
 All-Americans
 Hank Gathers – Consensus 2nd Team
 Bo Kimble – Consensus 2nd Team

 NCAA Scoring Leader
 Bo Kimble – 35.3 PPG

 WCC Player of the Year
 Bo Kimble

Records
Season
 Points Per Game – 122.4 (3,918 points in 32 games)
 Games with at Least 100 Points – 28
 Consecutive Games with at Least 100 Points – 12

NCAA Tournament
Team
 Most points in an NCAA Tournament game – 149 vs. Michigan (March 18, 1990)
 Most combined points in an NCAA Tournament game – 264 vs. Michigan (March 18, 1990)
 Most 3-point field goals in an NCAA Tournament game – 21 vs. Michigan (March 18, 1990)
 Points Per Game – 105.8 (423 points in 4 games)

Individual
 Most 3-point field goals made (single game) – 11 by Jeff Fryer vs. Michigan (March 18, 1990)
 Most 3-point field goals attempted (single game) – 22 by Jeff Fryer vs. Michigan (March 18, 1990)

Players in the 1990 NBA draft

References

External links
 LMU LIONS 1989-1990 MEN'S BASKETBALL 

Loyola Marymount Lions men's basketball seasons
Loyola Marymount
Loyola Marymount
Loyola Marymount
Loyola Marymount
Loyola Marymount
Loyola Marymount